Swimming competitions at the 2022 Bolivarian Games in Valledupar, Colombia were held from 2 to 5 July 2022 at the Aquatics Complex in the Popular University of Cesar cluster, with the marathons swimming being held at Ciénaga de Zapatosa in Chimichagua, a sub-venue outside Valledupar.

Forty medal events were scheduled to be contested including the open-water marathons; 34 swimming events equally divided among men and women, two mixed swimming events and 4 open-water marathons (2 per gender). A total of 143 athletes competed in the events, including 21 from the open-water marathons. The events were open competitions without age restrictions.

Venezuela were the swimming competitions defending champions having won them in the previous edition in Santa Marta 2017. Colombia obtained 15 of the 40 gold medals at stake to win the swimming competitions.

Participating nations
A total of 10 nations (all 7 ODEBO nations and 3 invited) registered athletes for the swimming competitions. Each nation was able to enter a maximum of 28 swimmers (14 per gender) for the pool events and up to 4 swimmers (2 per gender) for the open-water events.

Events
The following events were scheduled to be contested (all pool events are long course, and distances are in metres unless stated):
Freestyle: 50, 100, 200, 400, 800, and 1,500;
Backstroke: 100 and 200;
Breaststroke: 100 and 200;
Butterfly: 100 and 200;
Individual medley: 200 and 400;
Relays: 4×100 free (including mixed), 4×200 free, 4×100 medley (including mixed)
Marathon: 10 kilometres

Venues
The swimming competitions were held in two venues. Pool events took place at the Popular University of Cesar's Aquatics Complex in Valledupar, while open-water events were held at Ciénaga de Zapatosa in Chimichagua, a municipality located 147 km south Valledupar. Ciénaga de Zapatosa also served as venue for the rowing, canoeing  and triathlon competitions.

Medal summary

Medal table

Medalists

Men's events

Women's events

Mixed events

References

External links
Bolivarianos Valledupar 2022 Swimming
Bolivarianos Valledupar 2022 Open water swimming

2022 Bolivarian Games
Bolivarian Games
Swimming competitions in Colombia